Ivan Nikolaevich Kuylakov (born February 22, 1986) is a Russian Greco-Roman wrestler. 2013 World Wrestling Championships runner-up.

He has won four bronze medals in the Russian wrestling championships (2007, 2010, 2011, 2012), and is a two-fold winner of the "Golden Grand Prix Ivan Poddubny" competition (2009, 2011). In 2013, he won a silver medal at the 2013 European Wrestling Championships. Silver Medalist 2013 World Wrestling Championships.

References 

 Profile of Ivan Kuylakov on the site of Russia Sport Wrestling Federation

Russian male sport wrestlers
1986 births
Living people
World Wrestling Championships medalists
Universiade medalists in wrestling
Universiade gold medalists for Russia
European Wrestling Championships medalists
Medalists at the 2013 Summer Universiade
20th-century Russian people
21st-century Russian people